Navini is a small, private island within the Mamanuca Islands of Fiji in the South Pacific. The islands are a part of the Fiji's Western Division.

Geography
Navini is a tiny reef island. There is a small private resort there.

References

External links
Navini Island Resort

Islands of Fiji
Mamanuca Islands